Mei Yen “Christel” Bouvron (born 1 October 1984) is a Singaporean former swimmer, who specialised in freestyle and butterfly events. She is a two-time Olympian (2000 and 2004), a double finalist at the Asian Games (2002), and a gold medalist in the 200 m butterfly at the Southeast Asian Games (2003). Bouvron also became the first swimmer to qualify for the Olympics since 1920, while training for the Fighting Irish, and majoring in anthropology and classics at the University of Notre Dame in South Bend, Indiana.

Bouvron made her first Singaporean team, as a 15-year-old teen, at the 2000 Summer Olympics in Sydney. She failed to advance into the succeeding round in any of her individual events, finishing thirty-sixth in the 400 m freestyle (4:25.16), and thirty-second in the 200 m butterfly (2:17.62).

When South Korea hosted the 2002 Asian Games in Busan, Bouvron attempted to claim her first career medal, but settled only for sixth place in the 100 m butterfly, and eighth in the 200 m butterfly (2:17.42).

In 2003, Bouvron won a total of two medals in the same stroke at the Southeast Asian Games in Hanoi, Vietnam. Out of four tries in swimming, she only captured a gold in the 200 m butterfly final with a decisive time of 2:17.72, touching out Philippines' Maria Gandionco by more than two seconds.

At the 2004 Summer Olympics in Athens, Bouvron shortened her program by competing only in the 200 m butterfly. After winning her first gold from SEA Games, her seed time of 2:17.72 was officially confirmed and placed under a FINA B-standard. Bouvron participated in the first of four heats against seven other swimmers, including 15-year-old Maria Bulakhova. She rounded out a field to last place with a slowest time of 2:26.21, nearly 14 seconds behind winner Bulakhova. Bouvron failed to advance into the semi-finals, as she placed thirty-second overall in the preliminaries.

References

External links
 
 
 
 

1984 births
Living people
Singaporean female butterfly swimmers
Olympic swimmers of Singapore
Swimmers at the 2000 Summer Olympics
Swimmers at the 2004 Summer Olympics
Swimmers at the 2002 Asian Games
Commonwealth Games competitors for Singapore
Swimmers at the 1998 Commonwealth Games
Swimmers at the 2002 Commonwealth Games
Singaporean female freestyle swimmers
Notre Dame Fighting Irish women's swimmers
Southeast Asian Games medalists in swimming
Southeast Asian Games gold medalists for Singapore
Southeast Asian Games bronze medalists for Singapore
Competitors at the 2003 Southeast Asian Games
Asian Games competitors for Singapore
21st-century Singaporean women